Youssef Elbai (June 6, 1978 – May 24, 2009) was a footballer, who last played for Division d'Honneur side AS Orly. He played as a right-back.

External links
Youssef Elbai profile at chamoisfc79.fr

1978 births
2009 deaths
French footballers
Association football defenders
FC Nantes players
Chamois Niortais F.C. players
Stade Lavallois players
Ligue 2 players
SO Cassis Carnoux players
US Ivry players
SAS Épinal players
USJA Carquefou players
Racing Club de France Football players
Gazélec Ajaccio players